Risborough may refer to:

Saint-Ludger, Quebec, Canada, part of which was formerly called Risborough
Princes Risborough in Buckinghamshire, England
Risborough Rangers F.C., a football club based in Princes Risborough
Monks Risborough in Buckinghamshire, England